George "Butch" Addison Nash (December 13, 1915 – July 18, 2005) was an American football collegiate player and coach for the Minnesota Golden Gophers in Minneapolis, Minnesota. He played for the Golden Gophers from 1935–1938. During that time, he played the end position. Nash earned second-team Associated Press All-Big Ten Conference honors for his efforts in his senior 1938 season. He was later an assistant coach for the Golden Gophers from 1947 through 1980 (43 seasons) as primarily a defensive ends specialist. He then returned in 1984 as the junior varsity coach. He then worked as a volunteer coach from 1985–1991. He fully retired from coaching after the 1991 season. During his career, he worked under seven head coaches: Bernie Bierman, Wes Fesler, Murray Warmath, Cal Stoll, Joe Salem, Lou Holtz, and John Gutekunst.

Nash's career is highlighted by several key moments including National Football Championships in 1935 and 1936 as a player. As a coach, he earned a National Championship in 1960, a Rose Bowl victory in 1962, and bowl participation in the 1961 Rose Bowl and 1977 Hall of Fame Bowl

Another key highlight is the role he played in the 1977 and 1986 victories over the Michigan Wolverines. He delivered pre-game speeches to the team telling them the importance of the rivalry and the history of the "Little Brown Jug."

Nash also played basketball for the Golden Gophers and was on the 1936–1937 Big Ten Championship team.

Awards and championships

Personal life
Nash was married to Mary Leona "Lee" Nash and had three children.

Early life
Nash was born in Northeast Minneapolis, Minnesota on December 13, 1915. He attended Edison High School in Minneapolis and was a standout athlete in Basketball and Football. 

He died July 18, 2005 at the age of 89 years old.

George "Butch" Nash Scholarship 
The George "Butch" Nash Scholarship is awarded each year to a Golden Gopher Football Player. The recipient for the 2022-23 season is Jacob Knuth, Freshman Quarterback; Harrisburg, SD.

The Butch Nash Player Award
Since 1984, the Golden Gopher football team awards the Butch Nash award to player(s) that are "competitive on the field and in the classroom." The recipient list is below.

The Butch Nash High School Assistant Coach Award
The Butch Nash High School Assistant Coach Award given to outstanding Minnesota high school football coaches based on the criteria that they are an active coach, could be coaching at the varsity or lower levels, have a sufficient years of service to their program, along with other criteria mentioned on the Minnesota Football Coaches web site.

References 

Minnesota Golden Gophers football players
Minnesota Golden Gophers football coaches
1915 births
2005 deaths
Edison High School (Minnesota) alumni